The Guettard Range is a mountain range,  long and  wide, located northwest of Bowman Peninsula and between Johnston Glacier and Irvine Glacier, in the southeastern extremity of Palmer Land, Antarctica. The feature was photographed from the air by the Ronne Antarctic Research Expedition, 1947–48. It was mapped from United States Geological Survey surveys and U.S. Navy air photos, 1961–67, and was named by the Advisory Committee on Antarctic Names for French naturalist and geologist Jean-Étienne Guettard.

Features

 Irvine Glacier
 Johnston Spur
 Kelsey Cliff
 Mount Lampert
 Mount Laudon
 Mount Mull

References

Mountain ranges of Palmer Land